The 2004 United States presidential election in Vermont took place on November 2, 2004, and was part of the 2004 United States presidential election. Voters chose three representatives, or electors to the Electoral College, who voted for president and vice president.

Vermont is the home state of United States presidential candidate and anti-war advocate Howard Dean, its former governor.

Vermont voted overwhelmingly for the Democratic candidate, Senator John Kerry of Massachusetts, over incumbent Republican President George W. Bush of Texas.

Kerry received 58.94% of the vote to Bush's 38.80%, a Democratic victory margin of 20.14%.

Kerry also swept 13 of the state's 14 counties, breaking 60% in 6 of them. Kerry's strongest county was Windham County, which he won with 66.43% of the vote to Bush's 31.22%. Only one county voted for Bush, sparsely populated bellwether Essex County in the far northeast of the state, which Bush won with 54.17% of the vote. Bush thus became the first ever Republican to win the White House without carrying Caledonia, Orange, or Orleans Counties.

A state with strong liberal and anti-war tendencies, Vermont registered as the third most Democratic state in the nation in the 2004 election, its results making the state about 23% more Democratic than the nation. It also had the strongest Democratic swing of any state in the nation against Bush compared to the 2000 result. Even as Bush increased his nationwide popular vote support from a 0.52% loss to Al Gore in 2000 to a 2.46% nationwide victory in 2004, Vermont swung 10.20% against Bush, making the state trend 13.18% Democratic relative to the nation. This portended the future trend of the state toward dominance by the Democratic Party, as Democrat Barack Obama would carry the state in a 67-30 landslide four years later in 2008 and again in 2012.

Kerry, from neighboring Massachusetts, was the first Northern Democrat ever to carry Vermont. The previous three Democratic presidential candidates to carry the state were all from the South (Lyndon B. Johnson was from Texas, Bill Clinton from Arkansas and Al Gore from Tennessee), even though Vermont is a northern state.

As of 2020, this remains the only time a Republican has won the national popular vote without carrying Vermont.

Democratic Primary

Primary date: March 2, 2004

Results

Source

By county

Counties that flipped from Republican to Democratic
 Caledonia (largest municipality: St. Johnsbury)
 Orange (largest municipality: Randolph)
 Orleans (largest municipality: Derby)

By congressional district
Due to the state's low population, only one congressional district is allocated. This district, called the At-Large district because it covers the entire state, is thus equivalent to the statewide election results.

See also
 United States presidential elections in Vermont

References

2004 Vermont elections
Vermont
2004